Taqanpay-e Patakeh (also Romanized as Tāqānpāy-e Patakeh; also known as Tāqānbāy-e Patakeh and Tāqān Pāy Tīkeh) is a village in Bagheli-ye Marama Rural District, in the Central District of Gonbad-e Qabus County, Golestan Province, Iran. At the 2006 census, its population was 538, in 112 families.

References 

Populated places in Gonbad-e Kavus County